Kermoroc'h is a commune in the Côtes-d'Armor department in Brittany in northwestern France.

Population

Inhabitants of Kermoroc'h are called kermoroc'hois in French.

See also
Communes of the Côtes-d'Armor department

References

External links

Communes of Côtes-d'Armor